Baptist Village Communities (BVC) is a not-for-profit organization that provides aging services in Oklahoma. The organization was established in 1958 in Hugo, Oklahoma.
Services and features provided by the group include residential living, assistance in living, skilled nursing services and memory support. Dining opportunities, life enrichment programs, salons, house and lawn maintenance, and scheduled transportation are also offered.

The stated mission of the group is "To honor God by creating communities and services to enhance lives and enable people to serve God and one another."

BVC has 12 locations throughout Oklahoma.

Programs
Entrusted Hearts by Baptist Village (EH) is a service of Baptist Village Communities. It is a Medicare and Medicaid certified ministry offering services and assistance with daily living in clients' homes. EH is located in the Lawton, Oklahoma City, and Owasso areas.
  
EH also provides medical equipment and supplies to clients in these areas. These items are offered to a range of recipients, including individuals, long-term care communities, assistance in living communities and medical providers.

LINC® (Loving, Inspiring, Nurturing, Caring) is a program of Baptist Village Communities. LINC® is designed to work with local Southern Baptist churches and senior living communities and health centers, linking them together. LINC® consultants are utilized to assist churches in meeting the needs of residents. Comprehensive LINC® training workshops are offered throughout the year across the state.

Baptist Village Communities is an affiliate of the Baptist General Convention of Oklahoma.

References

External links 
 Baptist Village Communities
 Baptist General Convention of Oklahoma

1958 establishments in Oklahoma
Non-profit organizations based in Oklahoma
Organizations established in 1958